Eric Gründemann (born 8 September 1998) is a German footballer who plays as a goalkeeper for VfB Lübeck.

Career

SV Elversberg
On 6 June 2019 it was confirmed, that Gründemann had joined SV Elversberg.

References

External links
 Profile at FuPa.net
 

1998 births
Living people
Sportspeople from Magdeburg
German footballers
Association football goalkeepers
FC Hansa Rostock players
SV Elversberg players
VfB Lübeck players
3. Liga players
Regionalliga players
Oberliga (football) players
Footballers from Saxony-Anhalt